6-Fluoro-DET (6F-DET, 6-fluoro-N,N-diethyltryptamine) is a substituted tryptamine derivative related to drugs such as DET and 5-fluoro-DET. It acts as a partial agonist at the 5-HT2A receptor, but while it produces similar physiological effects to psychedelic drugs, it does not appear to produce psychedelic effects itself even at high doses. For this reason it saw some use as an active placebo in early clinical trials of psychedelic drugs but was regarded as having little use otherwise, though more recent research into compounds such as AL-34662 and AAZ-A-154 has shown that these kind of non-psychedelic 5-HT2A agonists can have various useful applications.

See also 
 5F-DMT
 5F-DET
 5F-MET
 5F-EPT
 6F-AMT
 6F-DMT

References 

Psychedelic tryptamines
Tryptamines
Fluoroarenes